Mount Burdell Open Space Preserve is a nature reserve in Marin County, California, United States, within the San Francisco Bay Area. It is managed by Marin County Parks. Hidden Lake, a seasonal pond located about halfway to the top, is home to frogs, salamanders and other creatures during the wet season. The Marin County Open Space District, with the help of local residents, purchased the  preserve in 1977. 

Certain portions of the preserve are grazed by small herds of domestic cattle during spring which helps to reduce non-native grasses.

References

External links
 
 Marin County Parks

Nature reserves in California
Protected areas of Marin County, California
Bay Area Ridge Trail